Wilbert (Bill) Hill Hopper,  (March 14, 1933 – July 3, 2006) was a Canadian civil servant and business executive. He was the president, chief executive officer, and chairman of Petro-Canada, a Canadian oil and gas firm.

Born in Ottawa, Ontario, he received a Bachelor of Science in geology from the American University and a Master of Business Administration from the University of Western Ontario.

In 1955, he joined Imperial Oil and in 1973 he became assistant deputy minister of energy policy in the federal Department of Energy, Mines and Resources.

In 1975, he was involved in the formation of the Crown corporation Petro-Canada was appointed president and CEO in 1976. In 1979, he became chairman and CEO and worked until 1993 when Petro-Canada was privatized. From 1983 to 1992, he was the Chairman of the Board of Westcoast Energy Inc.

In 1985, he was made an Officer of the Order of Canada for his "encyclopaedic knowledge of energy and of the environment in which the industry operates has enabled him to skillfully guide the development of the company into a major component of this country's petroleum industry".

He held honorary degrees from Wilfrid Laurier University and Memorial University of Newfoundland. He died in July 2006.

References
 
 
 Canoe Money "Former Petro-Canada CEO Wilbert Hopper dies in Ottawa after illness" 6 July 2006

1933 births
2006 deaths
American University alumni
20th-century Canadian civil servants
Officers of the Order of Canada
Businesspeople from Ottawa
University of Western Ontario alumni